Mammuth is a 2010 French drama film directed by Benoît Delépine and Gustave de Kervern. It was nominated for the Golden Bear at the 60th Berlin International Film Festival. For her role, Yolande Moreau was nominated for Best Actress at the 1st Magritte Awards.

Plot
Serge Pilardosse (Depardieu), retires from the job he has held for many years, as a slaughterhouse worker in Lyon. His colleagues throw him an impromptu party and give him a gift, which he doesn't like. Once home, he becomes all too quickly restless and realizes that being retired is kind of boring, as he has nothing to do. Eventually his wife convinces him to go and see about claiming a pension.

At the pensions office, he discovers that even though he has never missed a day's work for illness, nor been unemployed since college, he cannot claim a pension due to a few gaps in his pensions history, which he has to verify with 10 written proofs from each employer in question. Back home, his wife insists that he goes for the required papers so that the pensions claim can be processed. He takes his Münch Mammut motorcycle, nicknamed "Mammuth" and sails off through France to retrieve the documents.

Over the course of his endeavor, he loses his way and wonders about the sense of his life. He relives memories from his past, especially concerning his girlfriend who many years ago who died in a motorcycle accident. He visits his previous places of employment, old friends, his aging cousin and the home of his estranged brother, hoping to make amends. He also gets to know his niece, who introduces him to the world of naïve art. Realising that people perceive him as a bit of a jerk, he returns to his brother's house and his niece takes him into her world where he re-discovers himself and the poet within. Eventually he visits the site where the accident happened. He places a remembrance bouquet and shakes off the memories, finally liberating himself. He returns to his wife newly invigorated, happy about his future.

Cast
Gérard Depardieu as Serge Pilardosse
Yolande Moreau as Catherine Pilardosse
Isabelle Adjani as Serge's late girlfriend
Miss Ming as Solange Pilardosse
Catherine Hosmalin as Catherine's friend
Anna Mouglalis as  The disabled 
Benoît Poelvoorde as The competitor
Philippe Nahon as The hospital's director
Bouli Lanners as The recruiter
Bruno Lochet as The restaurant's client
Gustave Kervern as The delicatessen employee
Dick Annegarn

Reception
The film received mixed to positive reviews from critics. Review aggregator Rotten Tomatoes reports that 63% of 24 critics gave the film a positive review, for an average rating of 5.3/10. Metacritic gave the film a score of 47 out of 100, based on 5 critics.

Variety's Jay Weissberg described the film as "occasionally amusing". Matthew Turner from "View Auckland" shared this opinion ("frequently hilarious") but also complained the film's second part suffered with a "disjointed structure". Slant Magazine's review had a similar gist. Here Bill Weber wrote the film achieved "a few chuckles" with blunt jokes but the gags would become increasingly stale.

References

External links
Mammuth at unifrance.org

2010 films
2010s French-language films
2010 drama films
Films directed by Benoît Delépine
Films directed by Gustave Kervern
French drama films
2010s French films